The Gimcrack Stakes is a Perth Racing Group 3 Thoroughbred horse race for two-year-old fillies, run at set weights with penalties, over a distance of 1100 metres at Ascot Racecourse, Perth, Western Australia in March. Total prize money is A$150,000.

History
The event is named after Gimcrack, a successful English racehorse in the 18th century. Gimcrack won twenty-seven times in a career of thirty-six races. The race is a preparatory race for the highly regarded Karrakatta Plate held a couple of weeks later. Usually the winner will be entered in the event.

Name
In 1983 the race was run as the Toyota Stakes.

Distance
 1978–1998 - 5 furlongs (~1000 metres)
 1999–2004 –  1100 metres
 2005 – 1200 metres
 2006 onwards - 1100 metres

Grade
1978 -  Principal Race
1979–2014 -  Listed Race
2015 onwards -  Group 3

Venue
 In 2005 the race was run at Belmont Park Racecourse.

Winners

 2022 - Amelia's Jewel
 2021 - Hoi An
2020 - Starfield Impact
2019 - Rio Del Mar
2018 - Agent Pippa
2017 - Kiss Bang Love
2016 - Whispering Brook
2015 - Chantski
2014 - Fuld's Bet
2013 - Camporella
2012 - Darlington Abbey
2011 - Flying Affair 
2010 - Miss Condition 
2009 - For Your Eyes Only  
2008 - Danerip  
2007 - Jestatune      
2006 - Paris Petard     
2005 - Sportivo     
2004 - Refemme      
2003 - Diamond Dash     
2002 - Amphritite    
2001 - Magic Heaven    
2000 - Ebony Magic    
1999 - Lady Belgrave    
1998 - Terevega  
1997 - ‡race not held   
1996 - Most Secret  
1995 - Western Zip   
1994 - Our Cutey   
1993 - City Jewel   
1992 - Pluton   
1991 - Enchanted Angel    
1990 - Backpak    
1989 - Playtoss   
1988 - Hold That Smile    
1987 - Sovereign Lady   
1986 - Frown    
1985 - Haulpress    
1984 - Getting There   
1983 - Scornvale    
1982 - Just Rumours   
1981 - Lady Sculptor    
1980 - ¶Almenahtra / Scarlet Pearl   
1979 - Born Rich    
1978 - ¶Elegant Shell / Priority Road  

¶ The event was run in divisions
‡ Race moved in the WATC racing calendar forward from late spring (November) to autumn (March) of 1998

See also

 List of Australian Group races
 Group races

References

Horse races in Australia
Sport in Perth, Western Australia